Selvaggia Quattrini (born Selvaggia Appignani; June 25, 1975) is an Italian actress and voice actress.

Biography
Born in Rome to actress Paola Quattrini, Quattrini began her career on stage  at just eight years old and she made her very first appearances on screen by the late 1990s. Quattrini's earliest film was Marianna Ucrìa followed by Cuori perduti. She also made numerous appearances on television.

As a voice actress, Quattrini is best known for voicing Princess Fiona in the Italian-Language dub of the Shrek franchise. She has most notably dubbed Kristin Kreuk, Paz Vega and Lake Bell in most of their work. Other actresses she has dubbed includes Halle Berry, Milla Jovovich, Frances O'Connor, Jennifer Love Hewitt, Keira Knightley and Leonor Watling.

Filmography

Cinema
Marianna Ucrìa (1997)
Cuori perduti (1997)
Gli angeli di Borsellino (2003)
But When Do the Girls Get Here? (2005)
Abbraccialo per me (2016)

Television
Doctor Giorgia (1997)
Non lasciamoci più (2001)
Una donna per amico (2001)
Incantesimo (2002-2003)
Imperium: Pompeii (2007)
Che Dio ci aiuti (2011)
CentoVetrine (2013)

Dubbing roles

Animation
Princess Fiona in Shrek
Princess Fiona in Shrek 4-D
Princess Fiona in Shrek 2
Princess Fiona in Shrek the Third
Princess Fiona in Shrek Forever After
Kelly in Handy Manny
Jeanette in Alvin and the Chipmunks: The Squeakquel
Jeanette in Alvin and the Chipmunks
Chloe in The Secret Life of Pets
Chloe in The Secret Life of Pets 2
Luminara Unduli in Star Wars: The Clone Wars
Jessica in Scooby-Doo! Camp Scare
Cleopatra in ChalkZone

Live action
Rita in Windtalkers
Peggy Hodgson in The Conjuring 2
Jules Paxton in Bend It Like Beckham
Domino Harvey in Domino
Georgiana Cavendish in The Duchess
Fiona in EuroTrip
Chun-Li in Street Fighter: The Legend of Chun-Li
Lana Lang in Smallville
Catherine Chandler in Beauty & the Beast
Tara Knowles in Sons of Anarchy
Charlotte Lewis in Lost
Alison Lockhart in The Affair
Maya Hansen in Iron Man 3
Claire Keesey in The Town
Alma Beers Del Mar in Brokeback Mountain
Ruth in A Million Ways to Die in the West
Sweet Polly Purebred in Underdog
Erin Gilbert in Ghostbusters
Maggie Mayhem in Whip It
Katie Van Waldenberg in Blades of Glory
Delilah Blaine in The Tuxedo
Divina Martinez in Paul Blart: Mall Cop 2
Cecily Cardew in The Importance of Being Earnest
Leticia Musgrove in Monster's Ball
Lynn in Sunshine Cleaning
Colette McVeigh in Shadow Dancer
Latika in Slumdog Millionaire
Beth Green in The Lucky One

References

External links

1975 births
Living people
Actresses from Rome
Italian voice actresses
Italian stage actresses
Italian television actresses
Italian film actresses
20th-century Italian actresses
21st-century Italian actresses